Ogonki may refer to:
Ogonki, Pomeranian Voivodeship (north Poland)
Ogonki, Warmian-Masurian Voivodeship (north-east Poland)
Ogonki, plural of ogonek, a diacritic mark used in Polish